The Morton County WPA Bridge, near Richfield, Kansas, United States, is a stone multi-arch bridge that was built from 1936 to 1939 by the Works Progress Administration (WPA).  It was listed on the National Register of Historic Places in 1986.

According to its NRHP nomination, it was deemed significant due to its use of distinctive construction methods which are no longer in use including "supported by a stone arch which is loaded by an earthen fill which in turn, is retained by stone spandrel walls."  It was also credited for maintaining the "integrity of location, design, setting, materials, feeling and association."

References

Road bridges on the National Register of Historic Places in Kansas
Bridges completed in 1939
Morton County, Kansas
Works Progress Administration in Kansas
National Register of Historic Places in Morton County, Kansas
Stone arch bridges in the United States
Buildings and structures in Morton County, Kansas